The 2019–20 Azerbaijan Cup is the 28th season of the annual cup competition in Azerbaijan, with Premier League side Gabala being the defending champions.

On 18 June 2020 the Azerbaijan Cup was abandoned due to the COVID-19 pandemic in Azerbaijan.

Teams

Round and draw dates

First round

Quarterfinals

Semifinals

Final

Scorers
3 goals:

 Clésio - Gabala
 Xazar Mahmudov - Keşla

2 goals:

 Davit Volkovi - Gabala
 Rahim Sadykhov - Sumgayit
 Bahlul Mustafazade - Sabah
 Roger Rojas - Sabah
 Julio Rodríguez - Zira

1 goal:

 Ulvi Isgandarov - Gabala
 Nodar Mammadov - Kapaz
 Ruslan Amirjanov - Keşla
 Mahir Emreli - Qarabağ
 Tural Bayramov - Qarabağ
 Ismayil Ibrahimli - Qarabağ
 Jaime Romero - Qarabağ
 Arsen Agcabeyov - Sabah
 Mahammad Mirzabeyov - Sabah
 Ulysse Diallo - Sabah
 Amir Agayev - Sumgayit
 Ibrahim Aslanli - Zira
 Mushfig Ilyasov - Zira
 Elvin Mammadov - Zira

References

2019–20
Azerbaijan
Cup
Azerbaijan Cup